The 1st British Academy Video Games Awards, awarded by the British Academy of Film and Television Arts, was an award ceremony held in February 2004 at the Radisson Portman Hotel in London. Hosted by Bill Bailey, the ceremony honoured achievement in 2003. Grand Theft Auto: Vice City was the major winner on the night, taking six out of the eight awards available.

Winners and nominees
Winners are shown first in bold.

Special Award
 Chris Deering

Games with multiple nominations and wins

Nominations

Wins

External links
1st BAFTA Video Games Awards page

British Academy Games Awards ceremonies
2004 awards in the United Kingdom
2003 in video gaming
February 2004 events in the United Kingdom